Richard Ludwig (22 May 1877 – 10 August 1946) was a German rugby union player who competed in the 1900 Summer Olympics. He was a member of the German rugby union team, which won the silver medal. Germany was represented at the tournament by the FC 1880 Frankfurt rather than an official national team. He is the brother of Erich Ludwig, who also played at the 1900 tournament.

References

External links

 

1877 births
1946 deaths
German rugby union players
Rugby union players at the 1900 Summer Olympics
Olympic rugby union players of Germany
Olympic silver medalists for Germany
SC 1880 Frankfurt players
Rugby union flankers
Sportspeople from Frankfurt